Jack Ferguson (born c. 1851) was a Scottish professional golfer who played during the late 19th century. His only top-10 finish in The Open Championship came at the 1874 Open Championship where he was tied for tenth place with James Morris and G. McCachnie.

Early life
Ferguson was born in Scotland circa 1851.

Golf career

1874 Open Championship
The 1874 Open Championship was held 10 April at Musselburgh Links, Musselburgh, East Lothian, Scotland. Mungo Park won the Championship, by two strokes from runner-up Tom Morris, Jr. This was the first Open Championship played at Musselburgh. Ferguson carded rounds of 41-46-41-41=169, finishing tied for tenth place. No prize money was won by the tenth-place finishers.

Death
The date of Ferguson's death is unknown.

Results in The Open Championship

Note: Ferguson played only in The Open Championship.
"T" indicates a tie for a place
Yellow background for top-10

References

Scottish male golfers